HMS Amphion was a 32-gun fifth rate frigate, the lead ship of her class, built for the Royal Navy during the 1790s. She served during the Napoleonic Wars.

Amphion was built by Betts, of Mistleythorn, and was launched on 19 March 1798.

Career
Amphion'''s first mission was to Jamaica in 1798, but by 1799 she was off Southern Spain under Captain Bennett. That year she captured a Spanish letter of marque, Nuestra Senora del Corvodorvya (alias Asturiana), on 25 November 1799. Asturiana was armed with eighteen 8-pounders and two 12-pounder guns, and four 36-pounder howitzers. She and her crew of 180 men were sailing from Cadiz to La Vera Cruz with a valuable cargo. She had been part of a convoy of five vessels. In 1802 Amphion was employed in attacking British smugglers in the English Channel and later conveyed the ambassador to Portugal to Lisbon.

In 1803 Amphion was paid off but later recommissioned and transported Horatio Nelson to the Mediterranean to take command. She remained in the Mediterranean under Captain Samuel Sutton, and was part of the fleet blockading Toulon. Amphion was one of the ships selected to hunt and capture the Spanish treasure fleet destroyed at the action of 5 October 1804. In October 1805 the captaincy was given to William Hoste at Lisbon, and he sailed to Gibraltar and subsequently Algiers before operating off Cádiz and Sicily.

After the battle of Trafalgar on 21 October 1805, Amphion was at the blockade of Cadiz. On 25 November,  detained the Ragusan ship Nemesis, which was sailing from Isle de France to Leghorn, Italy, with a cargo of spice, indigo dye, and other goods. Amphion shared the prize money with ten other British warships. On 28 July 1806 the 3rd battalion of the Polish-Italian Legion, 500 strong, surrendered to Captain Hoste in the Amphion and the 78th Foot at Crotone.

In May 1808, Hoste was ordered to attack the French frigate Baleine off Rosas. There Hoste operated against French and Italian shipping for the next three years, sailing from Lissa and periodically refitting at Malta. In this time, Hoste managed to capture or destroy huge quantities of French supplies and provoked the attention of a French squadron under Bernard Dubourdieu. In March 1811, Dubourdieu attacked at the Battle of Lissa and was heavily defeated, Amphions fire killing Dubourdieu and wrecking his flagship. Two other ships were captured, but Hoste was wounded and the ship returned to Britain.

In 1813 Amphion was attached to the North Sea fleet. On 8 December , under the command of Captain Lord George Stuart, and Amphion captured the island of Showen during the Dutch uprising. The two British ships landed a small joint force of marines and seamen, who met no opposition as the French surrendered first. In addition to prisoners, guns, and arms, the British re-captured a French gunboat and a brig of 14 guns that turned out to be the former .  was in company with Horatio and Amphion.

In early 1814 Amphion continued to attack French shore positions along the North Sea coast but with the end of the war returned to Britain. In 1818 Amphion sailed to Brazil and in 1820 she was decommissioned.

Fate
In November 1820 year Amphion was sunk as a breakwater at Woolwich. The wreck was subsequently sold in September 1823 to Joiliffe and Banks for breaking up.

Notes, citations, and referencesNotesCitationsReferences'''
 
  
 Ships of the Old Navy

External links 
 

Frigates of the Royal Navy
Ships built in Essex
1798 ships
Ships sunk as breakwaters